Bangladesh competed at the 1988 Summer Olympics in Seoul, South Korea.

Competitors
The following is the list of number of competitors in the Games.

Athletics

Men

Track events

Field events

Swimming

Men

References 

Nations at the 1988 Summer Olympics
1988
Olympics